João Victor Carroll Santana (born 2 September 1997), known as João Victor, is a Brazilian footballer who plays as a central defender for Guarani, on loan from Vitória.

Club career
Born in Recife, Pernambuco, João Victor joined Santa Cruz's youth setup at the age of ten. He made his first team – and Série A – debut on 11 December 2016, coming on as a half-time substitute for Marcílio in a 0–5 away loss against São Paulo, as his side was already relegated.

After spending the 2018 campaign on loan at Rio Verde and subsequently playing for Santa Cruz's under-23s, João Victor renewed his contract until 2023 on 26 February 2019, after starting to feature more regularly. On 5 September, he moved to Série B side Vitória on loan.

On 20 December 2019, João Victor was bought outright by Vitória, after the club acquired 50% of his economic rights. After five players from his position left for the ensuing campaign, he became a regular starter.

Career statistics

References

External links
Futebol de Goyaz profile 

1997 births
Living people
Sportspeople from Recife
Brazilian footballers
Association football defenders
Campeonato Brasileiro Série A players
Campeonato Brasileiro Série B players
Campeonato Brasileiro Série C players
Santa Cruz Futebol Clube players
Esporte Clube Rio Verde players
Esporte Clube Vitória players